KMWB (93.1 FM, "B93") is a radio station licensed to serve Captain Cook, Hawaii, United States.  The station is owned by the New West Broadcasting Corporation.

KMWB broadcasts a classic hits music format in conjunction with sister station KNWB (97.1 FM, "B97").  KMWB covers West Hawaii and KNWB serves East Hawaii.

The station was assigned the KMWB call sign by the Federal Communications Commission on October 4, 2007.

References

External links
KMWB official website

MWB
Classic hits radio stations in the United States
Hawaii (island)
Radio stations established in 1998
1998 establishments in Hawaii